The 2012 V8 Ute Racing Series was a motor racing series for Ford Falcon and Holden utilities (or "utes") built and conforming to V8 Utes series regulations and those holding valid licences to compete as issued by series organisers Spherix and Australian V8 Ute Racing Pty. Ltd. It was the twelfth running of a national series for V8 Utes in Australia. The series began on 1 March 2012 at the Adelaide Street Circuit and ended on 4 December at the Homebush Street Circuit after 8 rounds. It was won by Ryal Harris, driving a Ford FG Falcon XR8 Ute.

Teams and drivers
The following drivers contested the 2012 V8 Utes Series.

Race calendar
The 2012 V8 Utes Series was contested over eight rounds, all of which were held on the support programmes of V8 Supercars Championship events.

Series results

References

External links
 Official series website

V8 Ute Series
V8 Ute Racing Series